This is a list of flag bearers who have represented Bohemia at the Olympics.

Flag bearers carry the national flag of their country at the opening ceremony of the Olympic Games.

See also
Bohemia at the Olympics

References

Bohemia at the Olympics
Bohemia